Ptomaphagus cavernicola is a species of small carrion beetle in the family Leiodidae. It is found in Central America and North America.

Subspecies
These two subspecies belong to the species Ptomaphagus cavernicola:
 Ptomaphagus cavernicola aditus Peck, 1973
 Ptomaphagus cavernicola cavernicola Schwarz, 1898

References

Further reading

 
 

Leiodidae
Articles created by Qbugbot
Beetles described in 1898